Down in the Subway is a budget compilation album by Soft Cell. The album was released in 1994 and comprises singles, the b-side "Fun City" and selected tracks from their first three albums. The four-page booklet contains a brief biography by Mark Brennan.

Track listing
"Where Did Our Love Go?" - 4:27
"Memorabilia" - 5:24
"Torch" - 4:09
"Entertain Me" - 3:40
"Fun City" - 7:40
"Secret Life" - 3:39
"Kitchen Sink Drama" - 4:00
"Down in the Subway" - 2:53
"Baby Doll" - 6:47
"Where the Heart Is" - 4:35
"Insecure Me" - 4:41
"Seedy Films" - 5:08
"Loving You Hating Me" - 4:22
"Soul Inside" - 4:28

Notes
All songs written by Marc Almond and David Ball except for:-
"Where Did Our Love Go?" composed by Lamont Dozier, Brian Holland and Edward Holland Jr.
"Down in the Subway" composed by Jack Hammer (Earl Burroughs).

References

External links

Soft Cell albums
1994 compilation albums